A Boy and Sungreen is a 2018 South Korean drama film written, directed and edited by first-time director Ahn Ju-young. The coming-of-age film stars Ahn Ji-ho, Kim Ju-a, Seo Hyun-woo and Shin Dong-mi. It made its world premiere at the 23rd Busan International Film Festival and won KTH Award.

Plot
Bo-hee (Ahn Ji-ho) is a timid middle school student who struggles with the uncertainties of life. When he finds out that his mother has a boyfriend and that his supposedly-dead father is alive, he sets out to find him with his best friend Nok-yang (Kim Ju-a).

Cast
 Ahn Ji-ho as Bo-hee
 Kim Ju-a as Nok-yang (Sungreen)
 Seo Hyun-woo as Sung-wook
 Shin Dong-mi as Bo-hee's mother

Awards and nominations

References

External links
 

2018 films
2010s mystery drama films
2010s Korean-language films
South Korean drama films
2018 drama films
2010s South Korean films